The Association of Summer Olympic International Federations (ASOIF) is a non-profit association of international sports federations that compete in the Summer Olympic Games. It is headquartered in Lausanne, Switzerland, the same city where the International Olympic Committee (IOC) is also headquartered.

ASOIF Council
The council is composed of a president and six members, all from different federations. One of the six members is elected as vice-president. The president and all the members are elected for 4-year mandates. The executive director is nominated by the council on the proposal of the president as an executive position. The executive director is also on the council, but without voting rights.

Members

There are 28 full members and 4 associate ASOIF members:

History 

On 30 May 1983, the 21 International Federations governing the sports included at the time on the programme of the 1984 Summer Olympic Games decided to form the Association of Summer Olympic International Federations (ASOIF).

ASOIF was formed, as stated in the first article of its constitution 'to co-ordinate and to defend the common interests of its members' and to 'ensure close co-operation between its members, and members of the Olympic Movement and other organisations'. These needs were identified in order to preserve the unity of the Olympic movement while maintaining 'the authority, independence and autonomy of the member International Federations.'

The members of ASOIF meet once a year in a General Assembly. The General Assembly usually precedes the joint meeting between the executive board of the International Olympic Committee and the International Federations where a multitude of topics are discussed in the common interests of the Olympic Movement.

In 2015, the Organising Committee for the Olympic Games Tokyo 2020 had proposed five new sports in response to the new flexibility provided by Olympic Agenda 2020, the IOC's strategic roadmap for the future of the Olympic Movement. Olympic Agenda 2020 gives host cities the option of suggesting new sports and events for inclusion in their edition of the Games. Karate, skateboarding, sports climbing, surfing and baseball/softball was added to the Olympic Programme in Tokyo 2020. ASOIF has amended its statutes to enable IFs "governing sports included within the events programme for a specific edition of the Summer Olympic Games" to become "Associate Members".

ASOIF is administered by an executive body, the council, which consists of seven individual members, most of which are presidents of Summer Olympic International Federations.

The ASOIF General Secretariat is located in Lausanne and is administered by the ASOIF Executive Director.

See also
 International Olympic Committee (IOC)
 Association of International Olympic Winter Sports Federations (AIOWF)
 Association of the IOC Recognised International Sports Federations (ARISF)
 SportAccord

Notes and references

External links
 ASOIF website
 ASOIF at IOC website

 Association
Olympic organizations
International Olympic Committee
Organisations based in Lausanne
International sports bodies based in Switzerland
Summer sports
Sports organizations established in 1983